ORL is the abbreviation for a subspecialty within medicine:
 Otorhinolaryngology or otolaryngology – head and neck, or ear, nose, and throat medicine
 ORL (journal), a journal of otorhinolaryngology published by Karger

ORL may also refer to:
 Oil Refineries Ltd
 Okanagan Regional Library, a library system in British Columbia, Canada
 Oldham and Rochdale Line, a tram line of the Manchester Metrolink
 Olivetti Research Laboratory
 Omar Rodríguez-López, filmmaker, musician, leader of The Mars Volta
 Ontario Rugby League, a rugby league football association in Ontario, Canada
 Optical return loss in fiber optics and telecommunications
 Orlando, Florida, the U.S. city, is commonly abbreviated as ORL
 Orlando Executive Airport's IATA airport code
 Orlando Magic, the city's National Basketball Association team